Unorganized North Sudbury District is an unorganized area in the Canadian province of Ontario, comprising all portions of the Sudbury District which are not organized into incorporated municipalities. Despite its name, there is no longer an accompanying "South Part", as that subdivision has subsequently been incorporated into municipalities and Statistics Canada has not renamed the North Part.

The subdivision consists of three non-contiguous areas, totalling 35,594.71 square kilometres, or about 92% of the district. It had a population of 2,306 in the Canada 2011 Census.

Communities
 Benny
 Biscotasing
 Cartier
 Estaire
 Foleyet
 Gogama
 Mattagami
 Metagama
 Paget
 Shining Tree
 Sultan
 West River
 Westree
 Whitefish Falls
 Willisville

Ghost towns
 Burwash
 Jerome Mine
 Kormak
 Kukatush
 Nemegos
 Nicholson
 Ramsey

Demographics

Population:
 Population in 2006: 2415
 Population in 2001: 2910
 Population in 1996: 7147 (or 2929 when adjusted to 2001 boundaries)
 Population in 1991: 7463

Mother tongue:
 English as first language: 60.8%
 French as first language: 32.4%
 English and French as first language: 0.8%
 Other as first language: 6.0%

See also
List of townships in Ontario

References

Communities in Sudbury District
Sudbury North